Thomas van der Hammen (Schiedam, Netherlands, 27 September 1924 - Chía, Colombia, 12 March 2010) was a Dutch palaeontologist, botanist and geologist. He had published more than 160 works in five languages.

Biography 
Thomas van der Hammen was born in the city of Schiedam in South Holland, western The Netherlands and studied botany and palaeontology at Leiden University from 1944 to 1949. He was a deeply religious man.

After his studies and years of research at the University of Amsterdam, Van der Hammen arrived in Bogotá in 1951.

Thomas van der Hammen analysed the Bogotá savanna and concluded a great lake (Lake Humboldt) was present there around 60,000 years BP, covering present-day Bogotá, Soacha, Funza, Mosquera, Madrid, Cota, Chía and Cajicá. Van der Hammen has contributed greatly to the understanding of the geology of the Bogotá savanna and surrounding areas. He has worked with Gonzalo Correal Urrego towards an understanding of the prehistoric sites, as El Abra, Tequendama and Tibitó in central Colombia and has defined and described various geological formations, such as the Marichuela, Tunjuelo, and Subachoque Formations. His paleobotanical background proved valuable in dating the continental Cacho Formation.

In 2000, a natural reserve in the north of Bogotá bordering Chía and Cota, Thomas van der Hammen Natural Reserve, was named after the naturalist. The mayor of Bogotá, Enrique Peñalosa who ran twice for the Green Party, allowed for the construction of homes in the reserve, leading to protests of the people.

In 2003, Dr. van der Hammen granted a wide-ranging interview to Radio Netherlands about his work and his life.

Works 
This list is a selection.

Books 
 2008 - La Cordillera Oriental Colombiana Transecto Sumapaz - Estudios de Ecosistemas Tropandinos
 1986 - La Sierra Nevada de Santa Marta (Colombia) Transecto Buritaca-La Cumbre
 1979 - Changes in life conditions on Earth during the past one million years
 1953 - Late-glacial flora and periglacial phenomena in the Netherlands

Articles 
 2006 - La conservación de la biodiversidad: hacia una estructura ecológica de soporte de la nación colombiana
 2001 - Diversidade biológica e cultural da Amazonia
 1997 - El bosque de Condalia
 1981 - Environmental changes in the Northern Andes and the extinction of Mastodon
 1978 - Stratigraphy and environment of the Upper Quaternary of the El Abra corridor and rock shelters (Colombia)
 1972 - Changes in vegetation and climate in the Amazon basin and surrounding areas during the Pleistocene
 1966 - The Pliocene and Quaternary of the Sabana de Bogotá (The Tilatá and Sabana Formations)
 1957 - Climatic periodicity and evolution of South American Maestichtian and Tertiary floras
 1951 - Vegetatie en stratigrafie van het Laat-glaciaal en het Pleni-glaciaal
 1949 - De Allerod-oscillatie in Nederland. Pollenanalytisch onderzoek van een laatglaciale meerafzetting in Drente

See also 

Tequendama, Tibitó
Gonzalo Correal Urrego, Bogotá savanna, El Abra, Thomas van der Hammen Natural Reserve

References

Bibliography

Notable works by Van der Hammen

External links 
  Youtube.com:  Interview with Thomas van der Hammen—

1924 births
2010 deaths
20th-century Dutch male writers
20th-century  Dutch geologists
21st-century Dutch writers
21st-century  Dutch geologists
20th-century Colombian botanists
20th-century Dutch botanists
21st-century Dutch botanists
Dutch emigrants to Colombia
Dutch paleontologists
Leiden University alumni
Muisca scholars
People from Schiedam